Canadia may refer to:

 Canadia, a humorous name for Canada
 Canadia (annelid), a genus of stem group annelid worms, found in the Burgess Shale
 Canadia Bank, a bank in Cambodia
 Canadia: 2056, a Canadian Broadcasting Corporation radio series
 "Canadia", a song by MC Frontalot on the album Final Boss

See also
 Canada (disambiguation)
 Candida (disambiguation)